Jeffrey Cobb (ジェフ・コブ　Jefu Kobu, born July 11, 1982) is an American professional wrestler and former amateur wrestler currently signed to New Japan Pro-Wrestling (NJPW) where he is a two-time IWGP Tag Team Champion with United Empire teammate Great-O-Khan.

Prior to coming to NJPW, Cobb wrestled in Lucha Underground (as the masked wrestler Matanza Cueto), Ring of Honor (ROH) and Pro Wrestling Guerrilla (PWG). He is a former PWG World Champion and is also the winner of PWG's 2018 Battle of Los Angeles tournament and a former one-time World Tag Team Champion with Matt Riddle. He is also a former NEVER Openweight Champion in NJPW and former ROH Television Champion in ROH.

As an amateur wrestler, Cobb represented Guam at the 2004 Summer Olympics, where he became the nation's flag bearer in the opening ceremony and competed in the men's light heavyweight freestyle category. He transitioned to professional wrestling in 2009.

Amateur wrestling career 

During his amateur wrestling career, Cobb trained for the Guam Amateur Wrestling Federation under his personal coach Neil Krantz. Cobb qualified for the Guamanian squad in the men's 84 kg class at the 2004 Summer Olympics in Athens by receiving a continental berth from the Oceanian Championships in Dededo. He received two straight losses due to technical superiority and no classification points in a preliminary pool match against Cuba's Yoel Romero and Germany's Davyd Bichinashvili, finishing 21st overall out of 22 wrestlers.

Professional wrestling career

Early career (2009–2014) 
Cobb began professional wrestling in 2009 working for Action Zone Wrestling in Hawaii. He won the AZW Heavyweight Title a record setting three times. He made appearances for many independent promotions in Northern California such as All Pro Wrestling, Supreme Pro Wrestling, Pro Wrestling Bushido, Fighting Spirit Pro, Phoenix Pro Wrestling and PREMIER Wrestling, where he held their heavyweight championship for 427 days. In September 2014, he received a tryout at the WWE Performance Center.

Lucha Underground (2015–2019) 
Cobb signed to Lucha Underground in 2015. He debuted for the promotion on March 22, 2016, under a mask and the ring name "The Monster" Matanza Cueto, the storyline brother of Dario Cueto, winning the Lucha Underground Championship in his first match.

Matanza remained undefeated until April 9, 2016, when he was pinned by Rey Mysterio in an Aztec Warfare match, losing the Lucha Underground Championship in the process.

His character was killed off in the fourth season, which aired in 2018. Despite this, it was reported in April 2019 that Cobb was seeking legal action to be released from his Lucha Underground contract. This came after similar motions from others on the show, including King Cuerno and Joey Ryan. More days later, it would be confirmed that he had been released from the company.

Pro Wrestling Guerrilla (2016–2019) 

On May 20, 2016, Cobb made his debut for Pro Wrestling Guerrilla (PWG), losing to Chris Hero. On September 2, Cobb entered the 2016 Battle of Los Angeles, from which he was eliminated in the first round by Ricochet.

On December 16, 2016, Cobb and Matthew Riddle defeated The Young Bucks. Cobb and Riddle were later known in PWG as "The Chosen Bros." On February 18, 2017, Cobb and Riddle would defeat the Unbreakable F'n Machines (Brian Cage and Michael Elgin). On March 18, 2017, the team would beat OI4K (Dave Crist and Jake Crist). On April 21, 2017, Cobb, in singles action, would defeat Keith Lee. On May 19, 2017, The Chosen Bros defeated reDRagon (Kyle O'Reilly and Bobby Fish). On October 20, The Chosen Bros defeated the Lucha Brothers (Rey Fenix and Penta el Zero M) to win the PWG World Tag Team Championship. They retained the titles until April 20, 2018, when they lost them against The Rascalz
(Zachary Wentz and Dezmond Xavier). On September 15–16, 2018, he went on to win the 2018 Battle of Los Angeles, beating Darby Allin in the first round, Rey Horus in the second round, Trevor Lee in the third round, and Shingo Takagi and Bandido in the final.

On October 19, Cobb defeated Walter at Smokey and the Bandido to win the PWG World Championship. He then successfully defended it against Trevor Lee at Hand of Doom in January 2019. He would also successfully defend his title against Johnathan Gresham and BOLA runner up Bandido during his reign. He then competed in his 4th Battle of Los Angeles but fell in the second round to David Starr. He would go on to drop the title after 421 days in a rematch with eventual tournament winner Bandido later that year.

Progress Wrestling (2017–2018) 
On May 27, 2017, Cobb made his Progress Wrestling debut by defeating Nathan Cruz in the first round of the Super Strong Style 16 Tournament 2017. The following day, Cobb lost his second round match to Matthew Riddle. On May 29, Cobb received his first shot at the Progress World Championship, losing to Pete Dunne.

New Japan Pro-Wrestling

Early beginnings and championship reigns (2017–2019)
On November 6, 2017, Cobb was announced as a participant in New Japan Pro-Wrestling's 2017 World Tag League, where he would team with Michael Elgin. Cobb and Elgin did not get along behind the scenes with Elgin making disparaging remarks about his tag team partner in private messages that were made public while the tournament was still in progress. The two finished the tournament on December 9 with a record of four wins and three losses, failing to advance to the finals. On June 11, 2018, it was announced that Cobb would return to New Japan Pro-Wrestling for Kizuna Road shows. On June 17, it was announced that Jeff Cobb would face Hirooki Goto for his NEVER Openweight Championship. He would go on to lose the match. Cobb spent the bulk of late 2018 participating in the World Tag League tournament with partner Michael Elgin, winning eight matches, but failing to qualify for the finals. On April 6, 2019, Cobb won the NEVER Openweight Championship in a Winner takes all match against Will Ospreay at G1 Supercard. Cobb's ROH World Television Championship was also on the line. Cobb would eventually lose the NEVER Openweight Championship to Taichi in the first night of Wrestling Dontaku 2019. Cobb then competed in his first 2019 G1 Climax Tournament where he finished with 8 points thus failing to advance to the finals. On November 6, 2019,  Cobb was announced to be in one of the teams in the 2019 World Tag League Tournament with tag partner Mikey Nicholls where they finished with 16 points failing to advance to the finals.

United Empire (2020–present) 
In August 2020, Cobb competed in the New Japan Cup USA where he defeated Tanga Loa in the first round before losing to Kenta in the semi-finals. Cobb was also announced to be competing in the 2020 G1 Climax tournament where he again finished with 8 points, failing to advance to the finals. It was also reported that Cobb had signed a contract with New Japan, officially joining the roster full time. He would join Will Ospreay's The Empire stable (later renamed "United Empire") at the November 15 show, teaming with The Great O-Khan in the annual World Tag League thus turning heel in the process, though finishing the tournament with 10 points, failing to advance to the finals. At Wrestle Kingdom 15 in Tokyo Dome he challenged Shingo Takagi for the NEVER Openweight Championship but lost the match.

In March, Cobb would participate in the New Japan Cup, he defeated Satoshi Kojima in the first round, but was eliminated in the second round by EVIL. Over the next few months, Cobb would team with his United Empire teammates in tag team matches against Los Ingobernables de Japon. Cobb began a short feud with Kota Ibushi which culminated in a match between the two at Dominion 6.6 in Osaka-jo Hall, which Cobb lost. Cobb then began a feud with Kazuchika Okada, which started when Cobb pinned Okada in a tag match. The two would exchange losses and victories over the next few months, with Okada beating Cobb at Wrestle Grand Slam in Tokyo Dome and Cobb defeating Okada at Wrestle Grand Slam in MetLife Dome.

In September, Cobb would enter the G1 Climax 31 and would be in the B-block. During the tournament, Cobb would break records, defeating Chase Owens, YOSHI-HASHI, Hirooki Goto, Tama Tonga, Taichi, Sanada, Hiroshi Tanahashi and EVIL therefore winning his first 8 consecutive G1 matches, the most consecutive wins in the tournament's history. However, on Night 18 in the B-block final, Cobb would lose to eventual G1 winner Kazuchika Okada, failing to advance to the tournament with 16 points, as Okada had also only lost one B-block match to Tama Tonga. On January 4 at Wrestle Kingdom 16, United Empire defeated Los Ingobernables de Japon on night one, but Cobb would lose to Tetsuya Naito on night two the following day.

In March, Cobb would once again enter the New Japan Cup. He defeated Togi Makabe, Satoshi Kojima and YOSHI-HASHI, but lost to Tetsuya Naito in the quarter final round. Cobb reshifted his focus to tag team competition with Great O-Khan who had been teaming with Aaron Henare. On April 9, O-Khan and Cobb became the IWGP Tag-team Champions for the first time in both men's careers, during the Hyper Battle series. The two lost the titles at Wrestling Dontaku, ending their reign at 22 days. They regained the titles on June 12, at Dominion 6.12 in Osaka-jo Hall.

After losing the titles at AEW x NJPW: Forbidden Door, Cobb was announced to be a part of the G1 Climax 32 in July at Dominion 6.12 in Osaka-jo Hall, where he would compete in the A Block. Cobb finished the tournament with 6 points, failing to advance to the semi-finals.

Ring of Honor (2018–2020, 2022) 
On July 21, 2018, Cobb made his Ring of Honor debut by attacking Eli Isom and FR Josie at a television taping. At Death Before Dishonor XVI on September 28, Cobb confronted Punishment Martinez following his defense of the ROH World Television Championship. At a television taping the following night, Cobb, in his first official match, defeated Martinez to win the ROH World Television Championship. Cobb then would win both of his matches during the two-day Glory By Honor XVI event in October, all three of his matches during the Global Wars 2018 tour in November, and defeated Adam Page at Final Battle in December to round out the year.

2019 began with Cobb winning a four-way match at Honor Reigns Supreme, and then winning all three of his matches (two of them being tag team matches) during the Road to G1 Supercard tour. At ROH/NJPW War of the Worlds Night 2, Cobb would lose the World Television Championship to Shane Taylor. After Cobb's contract ran out in 2020, Cobb stated he would still wrestle for ROH, albeit a lot less. In October 2020, his profile was moved to the alumni section.

On December 10, 2022 Cobb defeated Máscara Dorada during the Final Battle Pre-show.

All Elite Wrestling (2020, 2022) 
Cobb made his debut for All Elite Wrestling (AEW) on the February 12, 2020 episode of AEW Dynamite, attacking Jon Moxley alongside The Inner Circle. He wrestled his AEW debut match on the following week's episode of Dynamite, in a losing effort to Moxley.

On the May 25, 2022 episode of AEW Dynamite, Cobb and Great-O-Khan interrupted a match for the ROH World Tag Team Championships, between FTR and Roppongi Vice attacking both teams, and raising the titles signaling their intentions of challenging for the championships. After both men along with United Empire stablemates Aaron Henare, Kyle Fletcher, Mark Davis and Will Ospreay all attacked both men on the June 15 special Road Rager episode of Dynamite, Ospreay was announced to face Orange Cassidy, whilst Cobb and O-Khan were placed into a triple-threat tag-team Winner Takes All match for their newly won IWGP Tag Team Championships and FTR's ROH World Tag Team Championships, along with Roppongi Vice at AEWxNJPW: Forbidden Door. At the event, Cobb and O-Khan both failed to capture the ROH World Tag Team Titles lost the IWGP Tag Team Titles to FTR.

Professional wrestling style and persona
Cobb's finishers are a spinning scoop powerslam variation called "The Tour of the Islands" and a Gachimuchi-Sault.

During his work in Lucha Underground, Cobb performed as "The Monster" Matanza Cueto, wearing a mask and a boilersuit. He described his character like Jason Voorhees or Michael Myers. During this time, his finisher was called "Wrath of the Gods".

Personal life
Cobb is of Filipino descent on his mother's side. His mother, Elaine was born in Guam to Filipino immigrants. Cobb's parents later moved to Hawai'i, where he was born, but moved back to Guam when he was 11.

Championships and accomplishments
AAW Professional Wrestling
AAW Tag Team Championship (1 time) – with David Starr and Eddie Kingston

Action Zone Wrestling
AZW Heavyweight Championship (3 times)

All Pro Wrestling
APW Universal Heavyweight Championship (1 time)
 Young Lions Cup (2012)

Big Time Wrestling
BTW Tag Team Championships (1 time) - with Kimo

Cape Championship Wrestling
CCW Tag Team Championship (1 time) – with Blaster

Fighting Spirit Pro
FSP Championship (1 time)

Lucha Underground
Lucha Underground Championship (1 time)
Aztec Warfare II

New Japan Pro-Wrestling
IWGP Tag Team Championship (2 times) – with Great-O-Khan
 NEVER Openweight Championship (1 time)

Premier Wrestling
Premier Heavyweight Championship (2 time)

Pro Wrestling Guerrilla
PWG World Championship (1 time)
PWG World Tag Team Championship (1 time) – with Matthew Riddle
Battle of Los Angeles (2018)

Pro Wrestling Illustrated
Ranked No. 23 of the top 500 singles wrestlers in the PWI 500 in 2019

Ring of Honor
Move of the Year (2018) for Tour of the Islands
ROH World Television Championship (1 time)

Ring Warriors
Ring Warriors Grand Championship (1 time)

Tokyo Sports
Best Tag Team Award (2022) – with Great-O-Khan

Freestyle record

|-
! colspan="7"| Olympic Games Matches
|-
!  Res.
!  Record
!  Opponent
!  Score
!  Date
!  Event
!  Location
|-
|Loss
|0–2
|align=left| Yoel Romero
|style="font-size:88%"|Tech. Fall (0–10)
|style="font-size:88%" rowspan=2|August 26, 2004
|style="font-size:88%" rowspan=2|2004 Summer Olympics
|style="text-align:left;font-size:88%;" rowspan=2| Athens, Greece
|-
|Loss
|0–1
|align=left| Davyd Bichinashvili
|style="font-size:88%"|Tech. Fall (0–10)
|-

References

External links
 

 
 
 Profile – International Wrestling Database
 Profile – Premier Wrestle
 

1982 births
21st-century professional wrestlers
American male professional wrestlers
American people of Chamorro descent
American professional wrestlers of Filipino descent
Expatriate professional wrestlers in Japan
Guamanian male sport wrestlers
Living people
Masked wrestlers
NEVER Openweight champions
Olympic wrestlers of Guam
ROH World Television Champions
Sportspeople from Honolulu
Wrestlers at the 2004 Summer Olympics
IWGP Heavyweight Tag Team Champions
PWG World Champions
PWG World Tag Team Champions
Lucha Underground Champions
AAW Tag Team Champions